Ramesh Hiraman Wanjale (12 November 1965 – 10 June 2011) was a Maharashtra politician. He was fondly known as the "gold man" in the Pune district because of his habit of sporting gold jewellery. He died on 10 June 2011 (aged 45) due to heart attack.

Political Journey
Wanjale entered politics as a sarpanch of Ahire village and went on to become an MLA in 2009 representing the Khadakwasla constituency. Before joining the Maharashtra Navnirman Sena, he was with the Congress and served as Deputy Chairman of the Haveli Panchayat Committee. He is survived by his wife, Harshada Wanjale who is also active in politics and is member of Pune Zilla Parishad and three children. He was the only MNS MLA from Pune.

References

External links
  महाराष्ट्र टाइम्स 11 June 2011
  DNA 11 June 2011
  The Hindu 12 June 2011

1965 births
2011 deaths
People from Pune district
Marathi politicians
Maharashtra MLAs 2009–2014
Maharashtra Navnirman Sena politicians
Indian National Congress politicians
Indian Hindus